Daniel Babka (born March 30, 1972) is a Slovak former professional ice hockey defenceman.

Babka played in the Slovak Extraliga for HK Dukla Trenčín, MHC Martin, HC Košice, HC Slovan Bratislava and HKm Zvolen. He also played in the Czech Extraliga for Motor České Budějovice and in the Ligue Magnus in France for Dragons de Rouen.

Babka also played internationally for the Slovakia national team and played in the 1997 and 1999 Ice Hockey World Championships.

Career statistics

References

External links

1972 births
Living people
Dragons de Rouen players
HC Košice players
HC Slovan Bratislava players
HK Dukla Trenčín players
HKM Zvolen players
MHC Martin players
Motor České Budějovice players
Slovak ice hockey defencemen
Sportspeople from Martin, Slovakia
Slovak expatriate ice hockey players in the Czech Republic
Expatriate ice hockey players in France
Slovak expatriate sportspeople in France